Paolo Iacullo (born June 8, 1977) is an Italian entertainer, designer tailor and ambassador of "Made in Italy".

Early life 
Lacullo was born in San Gregorio Magno and started his career as a radio speaker of Pablito DJ. He was an author in the newspapers "Cronache del Mezzogiorno," "il Salernitano,". In 2015 he started working in the fashion industry and was a part of the TV industry with his television projects on Sky channels from 2003 to 2012. Later he worked as a wedding planner in "the Doctor's House,". In 2019, he was appointed territorial ambassador in Salerno. In 2003, He was Stress di Notte TV presenter.

In 2004 he was a Basket Club presenter and reported for 1 segment of Stricia La Notizia. In 2005 he was a journalist for the Sky 902 Channel. In 2006 he was the Dolcevita Disco Club Salerno and was a TV reporter at the WMC winter Music conference in Miami. In 2019 he was appointed as a territorial ambassador in Salerno and expanded his fashion business by forming the CSI Moda distribution brand. Lacullo has started an clothing brand, “Capo” which deals in imported Italian fashion clothing in Toronto, Canada.

References